The following is a timeline of the history of Port Elizabeth in the Nelson Mandela Bay Municipality, Eastern Cape province, South Africa.

Prior to 20th century

 1754 - Dutch settlements at the Cape extended eastwards to adjacent Algoa Bay.
 1799 - Fort Frederick built by British during the Napoleonic wars.
 1820 - Port Elizabeth settlement founded by British.
 1823 - Population: 319.
 1836 - Made a free warehousing port
 1841 - Jetty constructed in Algoa Bay.
 1845 - Eastern Province Herald newspaper begins publication.
 1856
 Grey High School founded.
 King George VI Art Gallery opens.
 1859 - St George’s Park founded.
 1861 - Town of Port Elizabeth incorporated.
 1862 - Western-Road Synagogue formed.
 1865 - Hill Presbyterian Church consecrated.
 1866 - St. Augustine's Cathedral built.
 1873 - Railway station building starts.
 1875
Uitenhage-Port Elizabeth railway begins operating.
 Port Elizabeth railway station built.
 1880 - Prince Alfred's Guard Drill Hall built.
 1881 - Horsecar tram begins operating.
 1882
 Imbumba yama Nyama political group formed.
 Conservatory built in St George's Park.
 1885 - "South African Exhibition" held
 1888 - Mighty Elephants rugby team formed.
 1889 - St George's Park Cricket Ground in use.
 1892 - Opera House built.
 1897 - Electric tram begins operating.
 1899 - Humewood Road railway station built.
 1900 - Post Office built.

20th century
 1900-1902 - Port Elizabeth Concentration Camp in operation
 1903 - New Brighton black township established.
 1905 - Horse Memorial erected.
 1907
  (church) founded.
 Prince Alfred's Guard Memorial unveiled.
 1908 - Port Elizabeth Orthodox Hebrew Congregation formed.
 1912 -  built.
 1913 - Port Elizabeth gains city status.
 1917 - Airplane flown from Cape Town to Port Elizabeth.
 1928 -  (church) founded.
 1936 - Campanile (belltower) installed.
 1937 -  newspaper begins publication.
 1940 -  (church) founded.
 1940 - Victoria Park High School was founded
 1949 -  suburb laid out (approximate date).
 1950 -  newspaper begins publication.
 1951 -  (nature reserve) established near city.
 1952 - Govan Mbeki, Raymond Mhlaba and Vuyisile Mini were imprisoned for three months in Rooi Hel ('Red Hell' or North End Prison, Port Elizabeth) for participating in the Defiance Campaign.
 1954 - 20th Century Theatre in business.
 1960
 Boet Erasmus Stadium opens.
 Alliance Française of Port Elizabeth founded.
 1961 - 16 December: Bombings.
 1964 - University of Port Elizabeth established.
 1965 - Walmer, South Africa becomes part of Port Elizabeth.
 1969 - Kouga Dam begins operating in vicinity of city.
 1979 - Port Elizabeth Black Civic Organisation founded.
 1984
 Port Elizabeth Youth Congress founded.
 Development of Motherwell begins near city.
 1985
 March: Labor strike.
 8 May: Disappearance of "Pebco Three" anti-apartheid activists.
 27 June: The deaths of "The Cradock Four" political activists.
 1986 -  established.(de)
 1991 - Population: 303,353 city; 853,205 metro.
 1995 
 Nceba Faku elected mayor.
 Part of 1995 Rugby World Cup contest played in Port Elizabeth.
 1996 - Part of 1996 Africa Cup of Nations football contest played in Port Elizabeth.

21st century
 2001 
 Port Elizabeth becomes the seat of the newly-created Nelson Mandela Bay Metropolitan Municipality.
 Anti-apartheid leader Govan Mbeki dies at age 91.
 2004 - Website Mandelametro.gov.za launched.
 2005
 First premier of the Eastern Cape and anti-apartheid leader Raymond Mhlaba dies at the ages of 85 years.
 Nelson Mandela University formed.
 Red Location Museum of apartheid opens.
 2006
 1 March: South African municipal elections, 2006 held.
 Nondumiso Maphazi becomes mayor.(fr)
 Bay United F.C. (football club) formed.
 2009
 Nelson Mandela Bay Stadium opens.
 Zanoxolo Wayile becomes mayor.(fr)
 Southern Kings rugby team formed.
 2010
 Gelvandale Stadium opens.
 Part of 2010 FIFA World Cup football contest played in Port Elizabeth.
 2011 - Population: 312,392.
 2013 
 Part of 2013 Africa Cup of Nations football contest played in Port Elizabeth.
 Ben Fihla becomes mayor.
 2015 
 Danny Jordaan becomes mayor.
 Chippa United F.C. moved to the city from Cape Town.
 2016 - Athol Trollip becomes mayor.
 2021
 Name officially changed from Port Elizabeth to Gqeberha.
 2023 - Eight people are killed in a mass shooting.

See also
 Port Elizabeth history
 List of heritage sites in Port Elizabeth
 Timelines of other cities in South Africa: Cape Town, Durban, Johannesburg, Pietermaritzburg, Pretoria

References

This article incorporates information from the Afrikaans Wikipedia, French Wikipedia, and German Wikipedia.

Bibliography

External links

  (Directory of South African archival and memory institutions and organisations)
  (Bibliography)
  (Images, etc.)

History of Port Elizabeth
South Africa history-related lists
Port Elizabeth
Port Elizabeth